Rungwe is a District in Mbeya Region, Tanzania.  It is bordered to the north by Mbeya Rural District, to the east by Iringa Region, to the southeast by Kyela District, to the southwest by Ileje District and to the west by Mbeya District.

According to the 2002 Tanzania National Census, the population of Rungwe District was 307,270.

The District Commissioner of Rungwe from 26 June 2016 to 19 June 2021 was Mr Julius Chalya. The current Rungwe District commissioner is Dr Vicent Naano Anney (PhD) and he was appointed by the His Excellency President Samia Suluhu Hassan on 19 June 2021. Dr Vicent Anney before new appointment to the current position he was Musoma district commissioner from 26 June 2016 – 19 June 2021.  
Population
The majority of People who are living in the District are Nyakyusa by Tribe.

Wards

Rungwe District is administratively divided into 30 wards:

 Bagamoyo Ward
 Bujela
 Bulyaga
 Ibighi
 Ikama
 Ikuti
 Ilima (ward)
 Iponjela
 Isongole
 Itagata
 Kawetele
 Kikole
 Kinyala
 Kisiba
 Kisondela
 Kiwira
 Kyimo
 Lufingo
 Lupepo
 Makandana
 Malindo
 Masebe
 Masoko, Ward
 Masukulu
 Matwebe
 Mpuguso
 Msasani Ward
 Ndato
 Nkunga
 Suma
 Swaya

References

External links
 

 
Districts of Mbeya Region